The first season of the television series Live Rescue began airing April 22, 2019, on A&E in the United States. The season concluded on August 19, 2019, and contained 16 episodes.

Episodes

References

2019 American television seasons